Dagmara Komorowicz (born 1 May 1979) is a Polish swimmer. She competed in the women's 100 metre backstroke at the 1996 Summer Olympics.

References

External links
 

1979 births
Living people
Olympic swimmers of Poland
Swimmers at the 1996 Summer Olympics
Sportspeople from Lublin
Polish female backstroke swimmers
20th-century Polish women